Southeast Bank Limited is a private commercial bank in Bangladesh. Alamgir Kabir is chairman of the bank and M Kamal Hossain is the managing director of the bank.

History 
Southeast Bank Limited was established as a Public Limited Company on March 12, 1995. In the Registrar of Joint Stock Companies and Firms issued the Certificate of Commencement of Business of the Bank on the same date.  The Southeast Bank received its Banking License from the Bangladesh Bank on March 23, 1995.  The Bank's first branch was opened by M. Saifur Rahman, the then Finance Minister of Bangladesh as the chief guest at 1, Dilkusha Commercial Area, Dhaka on May 25, 1995. The incumbent chairman of the Bank is Alamgir Kabir, FCA.  M. A. Kashem a member of the Board and Yussuf Abdullah Harun were past Presidents of the Federation of Bangladesh Chamber of Commerce and Industries (FBCCI).

Neaz Ahmed was appointed managing director of the bank in 2004. He was reappointed in 2007.

In May 2009, Alamgir Kabir became chairman and Ragib Ali vice-chairman of the Bank. Mahbubul Alam was appointed managing director of the bank. Bangladesh Bank started monitoring Southeast Bank Limited due to poor performance.

In December 2011, the bank started its 81st branch in Munshiganj.

Shahid Hossain was appointed managing director of the bank in 2013.

In 2016, 18.14% of SEBL's employees are women that will rise to 45% over the next five years.

In November 2021, Bangladesh Bank fined Southeast Bank Limited one million taka for overinvesting in National Life Insurance Company Limited which violated banking rules. Bangladesh Bank fined them 2.1 million taka for failing to reduce their investment.

The appellate division of Bangladesh Supreme Court in August 2021 halted a Bangladesh High Court order for  Anti-Corruption Commission and Bangladesh Bank to investigate against the chairman of the bank, Alamgir Kabir, on corruption charges following an appeal by Alamgir.

In September 2022, Chattogram Money Loan Court issued an arrest warrant against the chairman of Nurjahan group for embezzling 2.68 billion taka from Southeast Bank Limited.

Banking
The Bank maintained a capital adequacy ratio at 11.46 percent as on December 31, 2011, against requirement of 10 percent set by Bangladesh Bank. Credit Rating Information and Services Limited (CRISL) rated the Bank AA- (Double A Minus) for the long term and ST-2 for the short term based on the financial statements of the Bank for the year 2010. Their rating for the long term remained valid up to June 1, 2012. The Credit Rating of the Bank for the year 2011 has been assigned to Credit Rating Information and services Limited (CRISL).

Southeast Bank Ltd. made operating profits worth Tk 5.50 billion in 2012 against Tk 6.05 billion in 2011.

Board of Directors

Charity
Southeast Bank Foundation initiated a scholarship program for poor and meritorious student in 2009. The Foundation has, so far, distributed 827 scholarships to the secondary level students, while the number of scholarships to higher secondary level students stood at 1263. Since 2011, the program has been expanded to include graduation level students. On the occasion, scholarships were, for the first time, distributed to 75 students who are admitted at public universities, medical colleges, engineering universities and agricultural universities. In November 2022, the bank donated 75 thousand blankets to Prime Minister Sheikh Hasina's relief fund.

References

External links

 
 Official Cards website
 Southeast Financial Services (UK) Limited (SFSL)
 Southeast Bank Foundation
 Report On Southeast Bank Limited
 Report on Recruitment procedure of Southeast Bank Limited

Banks of Bangladesh
Companies listed on the Dhaka Stock Exchange
Banks established in 1995
Banks of Bangladesh with Islamic banking services